Bear Mountain is a  mountain summit located in the Kenai Mountains, on the Kenai Peninsula, in the U.S. state of Alaska. The peak's local name was reported in 1951 by the U.S. Geological Survey. The months May and June offer the most favorable weather for viewing the mountain. In fair weather, the Harding Icefield can be seen from the summit.

Climate

Based on the Köppen climate classification, Bear Mountain is located in a subarctic climate zone with long, cold, snowy winters, and mild summers. Temperatures can drop below −20 °C with wind chill factors below −30 °C. Precipitation runoff from the north slope of the mountain drains into Lowell Creek, and the south side drains into Spruce Creek, and both creeks empty into Resurrection Bay.

See also

List of mountain peaks of Alaska
Geology of Alaska

References

External links

 Bear Mountain Weather Forecast

Mountains of Alaska
Mountains of Kenai Peninsula Borough, Alaska
Kenai Mountains-Turnagain Arm National Heritage Area
North American 1000 m summits